Somerset Richard Butler, 3rd Earl of Carrick (28 September 1779 – 4 February 1838) was the son of Henry Thomas Butler, 2nd Earl of Carrick and Sarah Taylor. He succeeded to the title of 3rd Earl of Carrick and 10th Viscount Ikerrin upon his father's death on 20 July 1813. He was married twice, first on 1 September 1811 to Anne Wynne, daughter of Owen Wynne and Lady Sarah Cole. They had two children. He married secondly on 12 February 1833 Lucy French, third daughter of Arthur French, Esquire. They had three children.

Lord Carrick served as an Irish representative peer from 1819 to 1838.

Children
Anne Wynne
Lady Anne Margaret Butler (Oct.22,1829; died 15 May 1901) married George Whitelocke Whitelocke-Lloyd
Lady Sarah Juliana Butler (29 July 1812 – 28 April 1905) married William Thomas Le Poer Trench, 3rd Earl of Clancarty
Lucy French
Lady Lucy Maria Butler  (died 25 July 1896)
Henry Thomas Butler, 4th Earl of Carrick died at age 12 (19 February 1834 – 16 April 1846 Cheam, Surrey, England, bur. 21 April 1846 Cheam St Dunstan)
Somerset Arthur Butler, 5th Earl of Carrick (30 January 1835 – 22 December 1901)

References

thepeerage.com Retrieved February 3, 2008
Dod, Charles R. The Peerage, Baronetage, and Knightage of Great Britain and Ireland, Including All the Titled Classes. 6th ed. London: Whittaker, 1846. (p. 452) googlebooks Accessed February 3, 2008
A.E. and M. Innes (editors) The Annual Peerage of the British Empire Vol. I, London: John Murray Alberlmarle Street, 1827. (p. 143) googlebooks Accessed February 3, 2008
Doyle, James William Edmund. The Official Baronage of England, Showing the Succession, Dignities, and Offices of Every Peer from 1066 to 1885, with Sixteen Hundred Illustrations.  London: Longmans, Green, 1886.(p. 389) googlebooks Accessed February 3, 2008

1779 births
1838 deaths
Irish representative peers
Earls of Carrick (Ireland)